John David Burns (born May 1944) is a British chartered surveyor and property developer, founder and CEO of the FTSE 250-listed Derwent London.

Early life
John David Burns was born in May 1944. According to Burns, he entered estate agency on the advice of his mother, "My mother said it was a very gentlemanly business, which it was at the time and still is today, to a degree." He trained as a chartered surveyor.

Career
In 1961, Burns joined Hillier Parker as a property negotiator. In 1965, he became a partner in the estate agency Barnet Baker. In 1974, he became a senior partner in the estate agency Pilcher Hershman.

In 1984, Burns was looking for a shell company to manage his property interests and chose the Derwent Valley Light Railway Company, which was then the owner of a few disused railway stations and valued at £1.5m. This became Derwent London, with Burns as its CEO.

Personal life
Burns is married with two grown-up children. In 1997, his daughter Claire married the billionaire property developer Richard Livingstone. They later divorced.

References

Living people
1944 births
British chief executives